Gold Coast Sports and Leisure Centre is a multi-purpose arena and sports facility located at Carrara on Queensland's Gold Coast in Australia, capable of seating 5,000 fans. The centre is located adjacent to the Carrara Indoor Stadium and forms part of the Gold Coast Sports Precinct. A section of the centre also serves as a sports administration and indoor training facility for the Gold Coast Suns with the facility being called the Austworld Centre under a naming rights partnership, who play home matches and train outdoors at the adjacent Carrara Stadium and training oval.

Constructed for use in the 2018 Commonwealth Games, Gold Coast Sports and Leisure Centre hosted badminton, powerlifting, weightlifting and wrestling competitions. During the Games, it was called as Carrara Sports and Leisure Centre.

On 7 July 2018 the arena hosted a 2018 Suncorp Super Netball Round 10 match between Queensland Firebirds and Melbourne Vixens.  In October 2020, the Brisbane Roar moved their training base to the Gold Coast Sports Precinct and will predominantly use the Gold Coast Sports and Leisure Centre for their indoor training.

The venue will be used for Judo and Wrestling for the 2032 Summer Olympics and Boccia for the 2032 Summer Paralympics.

See also 

 Gold Coast Sports Precinct
 Sports on the Gold Coast, Queensland
 Venues of the 2018 Commonwealth Games

References 

Sports venues on the Gold Coast, Queensland
Indoor arenas in Australia
Sports venues completed in 2017
2017 establishments in Australia
2018 Commonwealth Games venues
Badminton venues
Weightlifting venues
Commonwealth Games wrestling venues
Netball venues in Queensland
Venues of the 2032 Summer Olympics and Paralympics
Badminton at the 2018 Commonwealth Games
Powerlifting at the 2018 Commonwealth Games
Weightlifting at the 2018 Commonwealth Games
Wrestling at the 2018 Commonwealth Games